The 1996 du Maurier Classic was contested from August 1–4 at Edmonton Country Club. It was the 24th edition of the du Maurier Classic, and the 18th edition as a major championship on the LPGA Tour.

This event was won by Laura Davies.

Final leaderboard

External links
 Golf Observer source

Canadian Women's Open
Sport in Edmonton
du Maurier Classic
du Maurier Classic
du Maurier Classic
du Maurier Classic